The Declaration recognising the Right to a Flag of States having no Sea-coast is a 1921 multilateral treaty which legally recognised that a land-locked state could be a maritime flag state; that is, that a land-locked state could register ships and sail them on the sea under its own flag.

As of 2013, the Declaration has been ratified by over 50 states, and international law recognises the right of any state to sail ships on the sea under its own flag. Today, land-locked states which have merchant vessel fleets include Austria, Azerbaijan, Bolivia, Ethiopia, Hungary, Laos, Luxembourg, Mongolia, Moldova, Paraguay, Slovakia and Switzerland, though of these, only Ethiopia and Mongolia have no river/sea port from which the high sea can be reached.

Background
In the first two decades of the 20th century, there had been uncertainty as to whether a land-locked state could register maritime ships and authorise them to sail under its flag: France, the United Kingdom, and Germany had argued that such a right could not exist because it would place a land-locked state in the position of being unable to control the behavior of ships of bearing its flag because of the state's inability to unreservedly access ports and the sea. Prior to World War I, Switzerland had denied several requests from merchant ships to fly the Swiss flag.

Creation, ratification, and effect
After World War I, the creation of several new landlocked states, such as Czechoslovakia, Austria, and Hungary, caused the Great Powers to reconsider the issue. The Treaty of Versailles had included provisions by which Germany agreed to allow these landlocked states to transit goods and personnel across German territory freely to seaports, which suggested that such states may also have their own merchant vessels in such ports.

The Declaration was created to reflect the new consensus and was concluded and signed on 20 April 1921 by 25 states in Barcelona, Spain, at the League of Nations Conference on Communications and Transit, as an addendum to the longer Barcelona Convention and Statute on the Regime of Navigable Waterways of International Concern, which was concluded on the same day. The Declaration entered into force on 8 October 1921.

Text
The text of the Declaration states:
The undersigned, duly authorised for the purpose, declare that the States which they represent recognise the flag flown by the vessels of any State having no sea-coast which are registered at some one specified place situated in its territory; such place shall serve as the port of registry of such vessels.
Barcelona, April the 20th, 1921, done in a single copy of which the English and French texts shall be authentic.

See also
Flag of convenience (exploited by landlocked Moldova, Mongolia and Bolivia)

References
John N. K. Mansell, Flag State Responsibility: Historical Development and Contemporary Issues (London: Springer, 2009 ) § 2.5.

External links
Text, League of Nations Treaty Series
Treaty status, un.org

Declaration recognising the Right to a Flag of States having no Sea-coast
Admiralty law treaties
League of Nations treaties
Declaration
Declaration
Treaties concluded in 1921
Treaties entered into force in 1921
Ship registration
Treaties of the Principality of Albania
Treaties of Antigua and Barbuda
Treaties extended to Australia
Treaties of the First Austrian Republic
Treaties of Belgium
Treaties of the Kingdom of Bulgaria
Treaties extended to Canada
Treaties of Chile
Treaties of Croatia
Treaties of Czechoslovakia
Treaties of the Czech Republic
Treaties of Denmark
Treaties of Estonia
Treaties of Fiji
Treaties of Finland
Treaties of the French Third Republic
Treaties of the Weimar Republic
Treaties of East Germany
Treaties of the Holy See
Treaties of the Second Hellenic Republic
Treaties of the Kingdom of Hungary (1920–1946)
Treaties extended to British India
Treaties of the Kingdom of Iraq
Treaties of the Kingdom of Italy (1861–1946)
Treaties of the Empire of Japan
Treaties of Latvia
Treaties of Lesotho
Treaties of Malawi
Treaties of Malta
Treaties of Mauritius
Treaties of Mexico
Treaties of the Mongolian People's Republic
Treaties of the Netherlands
Treaties extended to New Zealand
Treaties of Norway
Treaties of the Second Polish Republic
Treaties of the Kingdom of Romania
Treaties of the Soviet Union
Treaties of Rwanda
Treaties of Saint Vincent and the Grenadines
Treaties of Slovakia
Treaties of the Solomon Islands
Treaties extended to the Union of South Africa
Treaties of Spain under the Restoration
Treaties of Eswatini
Treaties of Sweden
Treaties of Switzerland
Treaties of Thailand
Treaties of Turkey
Treaties of the United Kingdom (1801–1922)
Treaties of Yugoslavia
Treaties of Zimbabwe
Treaties extended to Curaçao and Dependencies
Treaties extended to the Dutch East Indies
Treaties extended to Surinam (Dutch colony)
Treaties extended to Greenland
Treaties extended to the Faroe Islands
Treaties extended to the Dominion of Newfoundland
Treaties extended to the Aden Protectorate
Treaties extended to the British Leeward Islands
Treaties extended to the British Windward Islands
Treaties extended to British Cyprus
Treaties extended to the Colony of the Bahamas
Treaties extended to Bahrain (protectorate)
Treaties extended to the Colony of Barbados
Treaties extended to British Honduras
Treaties extended to Bermuda
Treaties extended to the Bechuanaland Protectorate
Treaties extended to the British Antarctic Territory
Treaties extended to the British Indian Ocean Territory
Treaties extended to the Colony of North Borneo
Treaties extended to British Somaliland
Treaties extended to Brunei (protectorate)
Treaties extended to British Dominica
Treaties extended to the Falkland Islands
Treaties extended to the Colony of Fiji
Treaties extended to the Gambia Colony and Protectorate
Treaties extended to the Gold Coast (British colony)
Treaties extended to Gibraltar
Treaties extended to Guernsey
Treaties extended to British Guiana
Treaties extended to British Hong Kong
Treaties extended to the Colony of Jamaica
Treaties extended to Jersey
Treaties extended to the Emirate of Transjordan
Treaties extended to British Kenya
Treaties extended to the Gilbert and Ellice Islands
Treaties extended to the Sheikhdom of Kuwait
Treaties extended to Basutoland
Treaties extended to Nyasaland
Treaties extended to the Federated Malay States
Treaties extended to the Crown Colony of Malta
Treaties extended to the Isle of Man
Treaties extended to British Mauritius
Treaties extended to British Burma
Treaties extended to the Colony and Protectorate of Nigeria
Treaties extended to Mandatory Palestine
Treaties extended to the Pitcairn Islands
Treaties extended to Qatar (protectorate)
Treaties extended to Saint Helena, Ascension and Tristan da Cunha
Treaties extended to the Colony of Sarawak
Treaties extended to the Crown Colony of Seychelles
Treaties extended to the Colony of Sierra Leone
Treaties extended to the Straits Settlements
Treaties extended to the British Solomon Islands
Treaties extended to British Ceylon
Treaties extended to Swaziland (protectorate)
Treaties extended to Tanganyika (territory)
Treaties extended to the Kingdom of Tonga (1900–1970)
Treaties extended to the Crown Colony of Trinidad and Tobago
Treaties extended to the Trucial States
Treaties extended to the Uganda Protectorate
Treaties extended to the New Hebrides
Treaties extended to Northern Rhodesia
Treaties extended to the Sultanate of Zanzibar
Treaties extended to Southern Rhodesia
Treaties extended to British Togoland